Kutateladze is Georgian a surname. Notable people with the surname include:
(
Apollon Kutateladze, painter
Guram Kutateladze, painter
Samson Kutateladze, physicist
Samson Kutateladze, Brigadier General
Semen Samsonovich Kutateladze, mathematician
Guram "The Georgian Viking" Kutateladze, UFC Fighter